David Woodley Packard, Ph.D. (born  1940) is a former professor and noted philanthropist; he is the son of Hewlett-Packard co-founder David Packard. A former HP board member (1987–1999), David is best known for his opposition to the HP-Compaq merger and his support for classical studies, especially the digitization of classics research. He has made significant contribution to the study of the language and the sign repertory of the Minoan Linear A script. Packard currently serves as president of the Packard Humanities Institute.

Packard was responsible for acquiring, with David and Lucile Packard Foundation funds, the former Mount Pony facility for the Library of Congress in 1997; it has opened as the National Audio-Visual Conservation Center. He also supports film preservation through the Packard Humanities Institute.  Packard also currently runs operations of the Stanford Theatre.

In 2000, Packard donated USD 5 million to fund an emergency excavation of the Zeugma archeological site, after reading about it in The New York Times, allowing archeologists to preserve ancient mosaics that would otherwise be inundated by the Birecik Dam.

Packard was elected to the American Philosophical Society in 2006.

See also
David and Lucile Packard Foundation
Lucile Packard Children's Hospital
Hewlett-Packard
HP Garage
Monterey Bay Aquarium Research Institute
List of wealthiest foundations

References

Selected works 
 (1967) A Study of the Minoan Linear A Tablets (unpublished doctoral dissertation, Harvard University)
 (1968) Contextual and Statistical Analysis of Linear A // Atti e memorie der primo congresso internazionale di Micenologia 1, pp. 389–394. Rome.
 (1968) A concordance to Livy. Cambridge, Mass: Harvard University Press. .
 (1971) Computer Techniques in the Study of the Minoan Linear Script A // Kadmos 10:52-59.
 (1974) Minoan Linear A. University of California Press. .

Living people
American classical scholars
Harvard University alumni
1940 births
People from the San Francisco Bay Area
Classical philologists
20th-century American businesspeople

Members of the American Philosophical Society